Kiwalik (sometimes written Keewalik) is an unincorporated community in the Northwest Arctic Borough in the U.S. state of Alaska.

It is now used only by subsistence hunters and travelers who stop to use the public shelter cabin on the public road (Kiwalik-Candle route) to access the graveyard, which is surrounded by private property. The community is now abandoned and dilapidated, filled with rusty hulks, trash and broken down buildings.

The area is often featured on the National Geographic Channel series Life Below Zero as one of the places the Hailstone family visits for hunting and gathering, thus demonstrating the subsistence skills necessary for life in this landscape and climate.

Demographics

Kiwalik first reported on the 1880 U.S. Census as an unincorporated Inuit village of "Kugalukmute." It did not appear on the census again until 1930, when it reported as "Keewalik." It reported again as Keewalik in 1940. It has not reported separately since.

References

Chukchi Sea
Mining communities in Alaska
Unincorporated communities in Alaska
Unincorporated communities in Northwest Arctic Borough, Alaska
Ghost towns in Alaska